Aurica Buia (born February 16, 1970, in Bratovoești, Dolj) is a retired female long-distance runner from Romania, who specialized in the marathon race during her career. She set her personal best (2:31:39) in the women's marathon in Vienna, Austria on April 14, 1996.

Achievements

References

1970 births
Living people
Romanian female long-distance runners
Romanian female marathon runners
People from Dolj County